John Whitmore (15 October 1750 – 9 October 1826) was an English merchant, banker and politician, Member of Parliament for  from 1795 to 1806.

Whitmore was Governor of the Bank of England from 1808 to 1810. He had been Deputy Governor from 1807 to 1808. He replaced Beeston Long as Governor and was succeeded by John Pearse.

See also
Chief Cashier of the Bank of England

References

External links

1750 births
1826 deaths
British bankers
Governors of the Bank of England
Deputy Governors of the Bank of England
Members of the Parliament of Great Britain for English constituencies
Members of the Parliament of the United Kingdom for English constituencies
British MPs 1790–1796
British MPs 1796–1800
UK MPs 1801–1802
UK MPs 1802–1806